is a private junior college in Higashi-ku, Sapporo, Japan, established in 1961.

Academic departments 
 Academic departments of Childcare.
 Academic departments of Fine Art studies.
 Academic departments of Music studies.

See also 
 List of junior colleges in Japan

External links
 Official website 

Educational institutions established in 1961
Private universities and colleges in Japan
Universities and colleges in Sapporo
Japanese junior colleges
1961 establishments in Japan